The Christian Democratic Union was a political party in Namibia led by Andrew Kloppers.

History
It was formed in 1982 through a merger of the Liberal Party and the Democratic People's Party. The party joined the Democratic Turnhalle Alliance.

A section of the Liberal Party reconstituted its party under the leadership of Barney Barnes, and stayed out of the alliance.

In 1988, the CDU broke with the alliance.

In March 1989, the CDU merged into Christian Democratic Party.

See also

List of political parties in Namibia

20th century in Africa
Christian democratic parties in Africa
Defunct political parties in Namibia
Political parties disestablished in 1989
Political parties established in 1982
1982 establishments in South West Africa